Elizabeth Gunning (1769–1823) was a French-into-English translator and a novelist.

Gunning was the daughter of John Gunning and writer Susannah Gunning.  Miss Gunning married Major James Plunkett of Kinnaird, Co. Roscommon, Ireland in 1803, and they had a son James "Gunning" Plunkett.
 She died after a long illness on 20 July 1823, at Long Melford, Suffolk.  Their other children included George Argyle Plunkett, who became a physician in Brooklyn, New York.

Works
She published several translations from the French, including: 
Memoirs of Madame de Barneveldt, 2 vols. 8vo, London, 1795. Prefixed to the second edition, in 1796, is a charming portrait of Miss Gunning by the younger Saunders, engraved by Francesco Bartolozzi, R.A.
The Wife with two Husbands: a tragi-comedy, in three acts [and in prose]. Translated from the French (of Pixèrecourt), 8vo, London, 1803. She had unsuccessfully offered this, with an opera based upon it, to Covent Garden and Drury Lane.
Fontenelles' Plurality of Worlds, 12mo, London, 1808.
Malvina, by Madame C—— (i.e. Cottin), second edition, 4 vols. 12mo, London, 1810.

Novels
 The Packet, 4 vols. 12mo, London, 1794.
Lord Fitzhenry, 3 vols. 12mo, London, 1794.
The Foresters, altered from the French, 4 vols. 12mo, London, 1796.
The Orphans of Snowdon, 3 vols. 12mo, London, 1797.
The Gipsey Countess, 5 vols. 12mo, London, 1799.
 The Village Library, 18mo, London, 1802.
The Farmer's Boy, 4 vols. 12mo, London, 1802.
Family Stories; or Evenings at my Grandmother's, &c., 2 vols. 12mo, London, 1802.
A Sequel to Family Stories, &c., 12mo, London, 1802.
The Exile of Erin, 3 vols. 12mo, London, 1808.
The Man of Fashion: a Tale of Modern Times, 2 vols. 12mo, London, 1815.

References

External links
 

1769 births
1823 deaths
English translators
English women novelists
18th-century English novelists
19th-century English novelists
19th-century English women writers
18th-century British women writers
People from Long Melford
English women non-fiction writers
19th-century British translators
18th-century English women
18th-century English people